Adjora (Adjoria, Azao) a.k.a. Abu is a Ramu language of Papua New Guinea.

A supposed dialect, Auwa, apparently with few speakers, may be a distinct language.

Sociolinguistics
Many Adjora words have been borrowed by Tayap, a nearby language isolate that is spoken just to the west of the Adjora area.

References

External links 
 OLAC resources in and about the Abu language
 Listen to a sample of Abu from Global Recordings Network

Porapora languages
Languages of East Sepik Province